"In Your Eyes" is a song by German producer Robin Schulz, featuring vocals from Norwegian singer Alida. It was released by Warner Music Group Germany to digital download and streaming formats on 10 January 2020. The song was written by  Erik Smaaland, Kristoffer Tømmerbakke, Gaute Ormåsen and Alida Garpestad Peck, and produced by Robin Schulz and Daniel Deimann & Dennis "Junkx" Bierbrodt.

Music video
The video was published on 10 January 2020. In the video, incarnations of Toni Garrn and Robin Schulz appear in a dark hall and next to them two futuristic motorcycles.

Track listing

Charts

Weekly charts

Year-end charts

Certifications

References

2020 singles
2020 songs
Robin Schulz songs
Songs written by Robin Schulz
Warner Music Group singles